Woodhaven is a former railroad and trolley station on the Atlantic Branch of the Long Island Rail Road. Though it was also on one of the same lines as Woodhaven Junction (LIRR station) the two stations were distinguished from one another. Woodhaven was located on Atlantic Avenue, east of 87th Street.

History
Woodhaven station was a replacement for another station further to the east known as "Trotting Course Lane," which itself originally opened as Connecticut Avenue Station on July 31, 1837, by the Brooklyn and Jamaica Railroad at 94th Street. The name was changed to "Trotting Course Station," and then Trotting Course Lane Station" for service to horse racing fans at the 1825-built Centerville Race Course. Trotting Course Lane station closed in 1842. Very little evidence of the existence of the street near the tracks, let alone the station can be found today.

Six years later, a new station would be built west of Trotting Course Lane. Originally known as Woodville station, it was built in 1848. Sometime in or around 1859 the station was renamed Woodhaven, although the community itself was given that name on August 1, 1853, in order to distinguish itself from another community with the same name in the Finger Lakes Region. The station was re-opened as an Atlantic Avenue Rapid Transit station on April 28, 1905 with the electrification from Flatbush Avenue. In 1911 the platforms were widened. With the sinking of the Atlantic Branch into a tunnel, the station closed on November 1, 1939. The name would be revived again for Woodhaven Junction when the Rockaway Beach Branch was abandoned on June 9, 1962, until that station too was abandoned in 1976.

References

External links
Woodhaven Station image; July 26, 1905 (Arrt's Arrchives)
Woodhaven Station eastbound image 1918 (Unofficial LIRR History Website)
Site of former Woodhaven LIRR station (Road and Rail Pictures)

Former Long Island Rail Road stations in New York City
Railway stations in Queens, New York
Railway stations in the United States opened in 1848
Railway stations closed in 1939
Woodhaven, Queens